Waiting for the Messiah is a 2000 Argentine, Spanish, and Italian comedy drama film directed by Daniel Burman.  The film features Daniel Hendler, Enrique Piñeyro, Héctor Alterio, Melina Petriella, Stefania Sandrelli, Imanol Arias and Dolores Fonzi, among others.

The film won many awards including Best Film at the Lleida Latin-American Film Festival in Spain. The film takes place in a Jewish community of Buenos Aires.

Plot
The picture tells of Ariel (Daniel Hendler), a post-production video editor,  a young man who is torn between his devotion to traditional family ties and the desire for something different, and, of Santamaria (Enrique Piñeyro) an older bank employee who suddenly finds his life in complete turmoil.

Santamaria is unexpectedly fired from his bank job due to the world's stock market shocks. His wife takes this event as an opportunity to get rid of him and put him out on the street. Forced to make a small living returning stolen wallets, Santamaria finds some hope in Elsa, a bathroom attendant (Stefania Sandrelli) who is waiting for her husband to be released from prison.

Ariel is very much against the restraints of a future that will see him take over his elderly father's (Héctor Alterio) restaurant and marry an Argentine Jewish girl (Melina Petriella). At the same time, Ariel is also attracted to a sexy co-worker, Laura (Chiara Caselli), who tells him she's a lesbian.

Cast
 Daniel Hendler as Ariel Goldstein
 Enrique Piñeyro as Santamaría
 Héctor Alterio as Simón
 Melina Petriella as Estela
 Stefania Sandrelli as Elsa
 Chiara Caselli as Laura
 Gabriela Acher as Sara
 Imanol Arias as Baltasar
 Dolores Fonzi as Any
 Edda Bustamante as Mujer trampa
 Tajma Minoru as Oriental
 Juan José Flores Quispe as Ramón
 Eduardo Wigutow as Moshé Levin
 Beatriz Thibaudin as Anciana
 Sandra Sandrelli as Santa
 Dan Adaszko as Albino 1
 Ariel Adaszko as Albino 2

Background
The title alludes to the Jewish belief of "waiting for the Messiah"; in this case, characters are shown at first to be inactive and dormant, until death and crisis forces them to take action and reevaluate their lives.

Distribution
The film opened wide in Argentina on May 25, 2000.

The picture was then presented at the Toronto International Film Festival on September 14, 2000, and later at the Palm Springs International Film Festival on January 12, 2001.

Awards
Wins
 Valladolid International Film Festival, Spain: Critics Association Award; FIPRESCI Prize: For an honest, both realistic and symbolic depiction of human hopes in Buenos Aires today; 2000.
 Havana Film Festival: Grand Coral Third Prize; Cuba; 2000.
 Buenos Aires International Festival of Independent Cinema: Special Award to Enrique Piñeyro for his Acting Performance; Argentina; 2000.
 Biarritz Film Festival: Audience Award; France; 2000.
 Argentine Film Critics Association Awards: Silver Condor; Best Music, César Lerner and Marcelo Moguilevsky; 2001.
 Lleida Latin-American Film Festival: Best Film; Daniel Burman; 2001.

Nominations
 Bratislava International Film Festival: Grand Prix, Daniel Burman; 2000.
 Thessaloniki Film Festival: Golden Alexander, Daniel Burman; 2000.
 Valladolid International Film Festival: Golden Spike, Daniel Burman; 2000.
 Argentine Film Critics Association Awards: Silver Condor, Best Director, Daniel Burman; Best Film; Best New Actor, Daniel Hendler; Best New Actress, Melina Petriella; Best Original Screenplay, Daniel Burman and Emiliano Torres; Best Supporting Actress, Stefania Sandrelli; 2001.

References

External links
 
 
 Esperando al mesías at the cinenacional.com 
 Esperando al mesías at La Butaca 
 

2000 films
2000 comedy-drama films
Films about Jews and Judaism
Films shot in Buenos Aires
Argentine independent films
2000s Spanish-language films
Yiddish-language films
Interfaith romance films
Italian independent films
Spanish independent films
Films directed by Daniel Burman
Films set in Buenos Aires